Pokémon Uranium is a fan-made video game based on the Pokémon series. The game was in development for nine years, and used the RPG Maker XP engine. The game adds 166 new fan-made species of Pokémon, with only 160 currently available, along with a new region. Similar to the official games, Uranium contains both online trading and online battling. In August 2016, after one and a half million downloads, the download links for Pokémon Uranium were taken down from the official website because the developers wanted to "respect Nintendo's wishes", after receiving multiple DMCA takedown notice letters from lawyers representing Nintendo. The following month, the developers announced that they had officially ceased development of the title and shut down the website and servers. Following the announcement, community members created a new website and continued to develop patches for the base game, including bug fixes and new features.

Gameplay and plot
In Pokémon Uranium, the player navigates through the Tandor region (based on Rio de Janeiro, Brazil), and encounters 200 Pokémon species throughout their travels, most of which are fan-made. The story follows a young hero as they journey through the region, collecting a total of eight Pokémon gym badges and eventually defeating the Pokémon League to become the Pokémon champion. The protagonist receives a Pokémon they choose from the new Pokémon Professor Bamb'o, and set off. The player's mother has been lost after an explosion at a nuclear power plant, and their father, Kellyn, remains cold and distant as he throws himself into his work to avoid dealing with his grief, leaving the player with their aunt. Throughout the game, the player is given reason to be suspicious as strange happenings are going on around them, and a severely irradiated Pokémon looms over the region, ready to destroy everything.

Online connections to other copies of a Pokémon game is a returning aspect of previous games to Pokémon Uranium. The Global Trade Station (GTS) allows players to anonymously trade Pokémon with each other.

Reception
The game was nominated for The Game Awards 2016 in the "Best Fan Creation" category, but was removed from the nomination page without notice alongside the Metroid fan game AM2R. Alissa McAloon of Gamasutra speculated that it was due to Nintendo's stance on unauthorized use of their intellectual properties.

While there are few full reviews for the title, CGMagazine's Elias Blondeau outlined that "Pokémon Uranium manages to be a deep, fulfilling round of familiar mechanics and a mature evolution of the very franchise it’s paying homage to."

References

External links
Official website for the community edition

2016 video games
Windows games
Windows-only games
Video games featuring protagonists of selectable gender
Unauthorized video games
RPG Maker games
Fangames
Pokémon